The Luxor statue cache is a grouping of ancient Egyptian statues unearthed in 1989. They were discovered in Luxor, beneath the solar court of the 18th Dynasty Pharaoh Amenhotep III.

Partial list of statues
Thutmose III as sphinx, alabaster, 
Amenhotep III, standing, red quartzite, 
the goddess Iunyt, seated, grey granite 
Tutankhamun as sphinx, alabaster (with paint remains) 
Horemheb, kneeling holding offering pots, diorite 
Amun-Re-Kamutef serpent, grey granite 
Amun-Re-Kamutef serpent, grey granite 
Goddess Taweret, sandstone,

History
The excavation was launched in 1989 under the authority of Mahammed el-Saghir, with routine maintenance by the Luxor antiquities inspectorate. The Luxor cache was buried during the Roman conversion of the area into a military camp. Originally five statues were found at a three-foot depth below a covering layer of small stones; eventually 26 statues were uncovered with some being damaged prior to burial.

Notes

References

Luxor